Johannes Wildner (born 1956) is an Austrian conductor, conducting professor, and former member violinist with the Vienna Philharmonic.

Biography 
Born in Mürzzuschlag, Austria, Wildner studied conducting, violin and musicology and has established himself as one of the foremost Austrian conductors.

His years of experience as a member of the Vienna Philharmonic and the Vienna State Opera Orchestra have given his conducting a distinctive stamp. He has been Principal Guest Conductor of the BBC Concert Orchestra in London from 2010 to 2014. In 2014 he became the director of the Austrian opera festival  in Gars am Kamp. He was appointed Professor of Conducting at the Vienna University of Music with the effect of October 1, 2014. From 2019/2020, Johannes Wildner will also be the Chief Conductor of Sønderjyllands Symphony Orchestra in Sønderborg, Denmark.

He regularly appears as a guest conductor in major opera houses such as the New National Theatre Tokyo, the Arena di Verona, Leipzig, Vienna Volksoper, Graz, Salzburg, Prague and Zagreb State Opera, and with orchestras such as the London Philharmonic Orchestra, the Royal Philharmonic Orchestra London, the St. Petersburg Philharmonic, the Tokyo Philharmonic Orchestra, Bavarian Radio Symphony Orchestra, the Orchestra Sinfonica Siciliana at the Teatro Politeama, Palermo, the MDR Symphony, the Dresden Philharmonic, the Vienna Symphony, the Vienna Radio Symphony Orchestra, the Bruckner Orchestra Linz, the Mozarteum Orchestra Salzburg, the Danish National Symphony Orchestra, the China Philharmonic, and the Hong Kong Philharmonic Orchestra.

Wildner has recorded over 100 CDs, DVDs and videos, including Johann Strauss' Die Fledermaus and Mozart's Così fan tutte, live recordings of Carmen and Le nozze di Figaro, Bruckner's Third and Ninth symphonies, and various CDs of previously unknown repertoire by Erich Zeisl, Joseph Marx and Johann Nepomuk David. In 2010 he released Robert Schumann's complete works for piano and orchestra, with pianist Lev Vinocour and the Vienna Radio Symphony Orchestra. In 2013, a recording of Beethoven's violin concerto with violinist Alexandre Da Costa and Beethoven's Seventh Symphony with Taipei Symphony Orchestra was released, as well as recordings of works by Walter Braunfels and Frédéric d'Erlanger with the BBC Concert Orchestra.

Opera Burg Gars 
List of performances at Opera Burg Gars under Wildner's direction
 2014: Der Freischütz by Carl Maria von Weber
 2015: Don Carlos by Giuseppe Verdi
 2016: Otello by Giuseppe Verdi
 2017: Die Zauberflöte by Wolfgang Amadeus Mozart
2018: Tosca, by Giacomo Puccini
2019: Fidelio by Ludwig van Beethoven

References

External links 
  
 

1956 births
Living people
Male conductors (music)
Austrian violinists
Male violinists
Austrian opera directors
People from Mürzzuschlag
21st-century Austrian conductors (music)
21st-century violinists
21st-century male musicians
Players of the Vienna Philharmonic